The Clerks of the Signet were English officials who played an intermediate role in the passage of letters patent through the seals. For most of the history of the position, four clerks were in office simultaneously.

Letters patent prepared by the Clerk of the Patents were engrossed at the Patent Office and then sent by the Secretary of State to receive the royal sign-manual. The duty of the Clerks of the Signet was to compare the signed bills with a transcript prepared by the Clerk of the Patents, and then to rewrite the transcript as a bill of privy signet, which was returned to the Secretary of State to be signed with that instrument.

By the end of the seventeenth centuries, many of the Clerks of the Signet performed their work through deputies, with the office itself becoming a sinecure. The Treasury was given the authority to reduce the number of clerkships in 1832, abolishing one in 1833 and another in 1846. The two remaining posts were done away with in 1851.

List of Clerks of the Signet 

 John Depeden c.1420 
 Thomas Andrew c.1422
 William Crosby 1437–1459 
 George Ashby c.1440 
 Robert Osbern c.1440 
 Edmund Blake c.1450 
 John Bowden 1452–1459 
 Richard Bell 1463–1474 
 William Robyns c.1470–c.1482
 Oliver King c.1473 
 John Wylde c.1475–c.1488 
 Edmund Gregory c.1479–c.1483 

The history of these earlier Signets in the medieval period is not recorded by the table below.

Appointments were not made under the Commonwealth of England until 1655 as the republic did not recognise hereditary house of Lords, so peerages were not created.

 1655–1705:John Nicholas
 16 June 1655: James Nutley
 20 March 1656: Samuel Morland

Appointments resumed upon the Restoration in 1660, including two of the former officeholders, Warwick and Windebanke.

References 

Bibliography
 J L Kirby (ed), Calendar of Signet Letters of Henry IV and Henry V (London 1978)
 Sir Nicholas Harris Nicolas (ed.), Proceedings and Ordinances of the Privy Council of England (7 vols, 1834-37)
 

Civil service positions in the United Kingdom
Signet